Terry Davis (born 1946) is an American novelist. He was born in, and lived near Spokane, Washington for many years, and is a professor emeritus of English at Minnesota State University, Mankato (MSU Mankato), where he taught Creative writing – fiction and screenwriting – as well as adolescent literature. Davis, who has been a high school English teacher and a wrestling coach, is the author of three novels for young adults: Vision Quest (1979), Mysterious Ways (1984), and If Rock & Roll Were a Machine (1992).  He has also written Presenting Chris Crutcher, a biography of the respected young-adult author.

John Irving called Vision Quest "the truest novel about growing up since Catcher in the Rye," and said, "it's a better novel about wrestling, and wrestlers, than The World According to Garp."

Vision Quest was made into a 1985 movie of the same title, starring Matthew Modine and Linda Fiorentino.

Early life
Terry Davis was born and raised in Spokane.  The son of a housewife and a sales executive, Davis excelled at Shadle Park High School as a wrestler and basketball player, then studied English at Eastern Washington University where he met fellow student Chris Crutcher – a year his senior.
 
Recognized early as a gifted writer, Davis went from Eastern to study under John Irving at the University of Iowa's Writers' Workshop, and later at Stanford University as an honored Wallace Stegner Literary Fellow. It was here that the novel Vision Quest began to take shape.

Recent years
Davis is a motorcycle aficionado, riding Norton and Yamaha bikes, and they play a role in much of his writing. He opened Terry Davis' Clandestine Classic Cycles in Rapidan, Minnesota in 2007. He continues to teach and write, including a current project about a man's struggle with clinical depression after his girlfriend gets addicted to online poker and is sent back to her homeland in Africa.

Awards
Vision Quest - ALA Best Books for Young Adults, 1980
Vision Quest - New York Public Library Best Books for the Teen Age, 1980
If Rock & Roll Were a Machine - ALA Best Books for Young Adults, 1993
If Rock & Roll Were a Machine - New York Public Library Best Books for the Teen Age, 1993
If Rock & Roll Were a Machine - New York Public Library Best Books for the Teen Age, 1994
Vision Quest - ALA Best Books for Young Adults In the Last Quarter Century, 1995

References

External links
Terry Davis's Homepage
Clandestine Classic Cycles article

20th-century American novelists
American children's writers
Novelists from Minnesota
Eastern Washington University alumni
Stegner Fellows
Minnesota State University, Mankato faculty
1946 births
Living people
American male sport wrestlers
Writers from Spokane, Washington
21st-century American novelists
American male novelists
20th-century American male writers
21st-century American male writers
Novelists from Washington (state)
Iowa Writers' Workshop alumni